Leptacinus pusillus is a species of beetle belonging to the family Staphylinidae.

It is native to Europe and Northern America.

References

Staphylinidae